Astrolirus is a genus of echinoderms belonging to the family Brisingidae. They are found in benthic habitats in the Pacific Ocean.

There are two known species:

 Astrolirus panamensis (Ludwig, 1905)
 Astrolirus patricki Zhang, Zhou, Xiao & Wang, 2020

References 

Brisingida
Asteroidea genera